United Nations Security Council resolution 711, adopted without a vote on 12 September 1991, after examining the application of the Republic of Lithuania for membership in the United Nations, the Council recommended to the General Assembly that Lithuania be admitted.

On the same day the Council adopted identical resolutions 709 regarding Estonia and 710 regarding Latvia. The three Baltic states were soviet socialist republics of the Soviet Union since 1945. In 1990 they declared independence and the UN resolutions were an important international recognition of their claim of independence. The resolutions were passed after the August Putsch in Moscow, which precipitated the collapse of the Soviet Union.

On 17 September 1991, the General Assembly admitted Lithuania under Resolution 46/6.

See also
 List of United Nations member states
 List of United Nations Security Council Resolutions 701 to 800 (1991–1993)

References

External links
 
 Text of the Resolution at undocs.org

 0711
History of Lithuania (1990–present)
 0711
 0711
September 1991 events
1991 in Lithuania